Native American feminism or Native feminism is, at its root, understanding how gender plays an important role in indigenous communities both historically and in modern-day. As well, Native American feminism deconstructs the racial and broader stereotypes of indigenous peoples, gender, sexuality, while also focusing on decolonization and breaking down the patriarchy and pro-capitalist ideology. As a branch of the broader Indigenous feminism, it similarly prioritizes decolonization, indigenous sovereignty, and the empowerment of indigenous women and girls in the context of Native American and First Nations cultural values and priorities, rather than white, mainstream ones. A central and urgent issue for Native feminists is the Missing and murdered Indigenous women crisis.

Overview
Native feminist Renya K. Ramirez, writes that, 
[T]he word Native in the term "Native feminisms" [is used] in order to concentrate on our similar experiences as Native women all over the Americas. But whether one utilizes a tribal name, "indigenous," "Native," "First Nations" or another term, highlighting the heterogeneity is essential for appreciating the varied experiences Indigenous women experience. Indeed, similar to other women of color feminists, this diversity encourages individuals to argue for the development of multiple feminisms rather than a singular feminism.

Ramirez sees a goal of Native feminism as redefining and establishing the struggles of Native women in a field where "feminism" is generally assumed to mean "white feminism". In her view, Native feminism is intersectional, and relationships between race, ethnicity, gender, sexuality, class and nations in North America from colonialism onward are to be reexamined as a means of understanding and identifying feminist praxis.

Indigenous Women Stereotypes and Misconceptions 
Native American women continue to face racial and ethnic stereotypes due to the discourse caused by colonialism in the 15th century. Because of this, many misconceptions continue to permeate today that can cause extreme harm to indigenous women. One major stereotype of Native American women is the idea that they are promiscuous. Ideas of the “Indian Princess”, such as the story of Pocahontas, cause these ideas as it is built off of the idea that these women are submissive, but instead Native American women are powerful self-thinkers. With these misconceptions and stereotypes can cause much harm, such as rape and assault which only increase the statistics of the violence against Native American women”. In one piece written by Renya Ramirez, she states “one cannot be both Native and a feminist, because feminism is ultimately derived from white culture.” This statement exemplifies the term feminism in connection to the natives, representing the difference between mainstream feminism and Native feminism.

Issues and Crises Native American Woman Face
Historically and in present day, Native American women have faced and continue to face oppression and violence. Statistics show that Native American women are the most likely demographic among women to be killed due to domestic violence. Indigenous women continue to be harmed by being more likely to experience assault and stalking. Native American feminists are facing violence from the patriarchy, both within and outside of their communities. As well as this, these women face being victims to forced sterilization and abuse to their reproductive rights.

A core issue in Native American Feminism is the missing and murdered Indigenous women (MMIW) crisis. The MMIW, “Missing and Murdered Indigenous Women”, movement advocates for the end of indigenous women that continue to be killed, assaulted, and stolen. Some statistics reveal that in 2016 alone, there were 5,712 cases of missing Native women. In accordance to these numbers, only 116 of these cases were logged into a database. Through this movement, Native American feminists are looking to amplify the rates in which indigenous women are being attacked and murdered in hopes to bring awareness to the injustice that they are facing. A red hand painted over one’s mouth has become the symbol of this movement to exemplify the violence and blood shed from the violence against indigenous women. Pressure from victims' families and their FNIM Indigenous communities finally led to the Canadian National Inquiry into Missing and Murdered Indigenous Women and Girls, which concluded that there is an ongoing genocide against Indigenous women in Canada.

Jennifer Brant and D. Memee Lavell-Harvard have written that the MMIW issues is often overlooked and not taken seriously  because Indigenous women face systemic racial and gender oppression.

Indigenous decolonization, as seen through the lens of Native American feminism, can involve the revitalization and reclamation of Indigenous matriarchal cultural traditions. Maile Arvin writes that during colonization white settlers imposed their heteropatriarchal practices onto Indigenous communities. Arvin states that Native American Feminists are reinforcing matriarchal processes through education and activism.

Cultural baggage associated with the words "feminist" and "feminism" has led to some disagreement about what to call "Native feminism". Kate Shanley, an Assiniboine feminist, believes that most Native women see "feminism" as solely a white women's movement, and therefore do not want to be associated with the word. She goes on to say that feminism as a concept, however, by whatever name, has a special meaning to Native women, including the idea of promoting the continuity of tradition, and consequently, pursuing the recognition of Tribal sovereignty.

Tribal sovereignty is central to Indigenous feminism, as well a pivotal political concern in Indian country, with Native American self-determination considered foundational to both cultural and material survival. In Ramirez's view, in order to accomplish this, tribal sovereignty must be re-conceptualized from Native women's perspectives.

Crystal Ecohawk writes,
Sovereignty is an active, living process within this knot of human, material and spiritual relationships bound together by mutual responsibilities and obligations. From that knot of relationships is born our histories, our identity, the traditional ways in which we govern ourselves, our beliefs, our relationship to the land, and how we feed, clothe, house and take care of our families, communities and Nations.

How Native Women Influenced the Women’s Rights Movement 
Before the modern feminist movement was apparent in society, indigenous communities had long before that been practicing female power. Indigenous communities often were inspired by the women in their tribes, and usually went to seek knowledge from them. Matriarchal views were more than typical in Native American communities, but as well focused on equality between genders. Additionally, indigenous communities recognized the idea of more than two genders long before it became recognized in modern society. Using inherent cultural practices, indigenous communities celebrated feminism before the term “feminism” was even used. During the 15th century, colonialism washed over the states and brought about many patriarchal ideas, which also included heteronormativity. With this came the attempt to persuade indigenous communities to instill this thinking, and this caused in emergence in feminism in later years.

The modern term for feminism that most know today was brought about by white feminists in the 19th century. While at its core, feminism celebrates ideas of gender equality, Native feminists essentially started the ideas of society celebrating women. While these white feminists were fighting for their rights, Native American women were already being celebrated in their communities. Looking at the earliest modern feminist movements, Native American women were a major influence. Some of the most influential women in this movement were Elizabeth Cady Stanton and Matilda Joslyn Gage. These women noted many ways in which indigenous culture influenced their ideas of feminism, specifically giving note to the Haudenosaunee (Iroquois) women who were observed living free lives in which they could do things such as own their own property or even play sports.

Native American Feminists 
Leanne Simpson: Leanne Simpson is Mississauga Nishnaabeg activist and scholar. Simpson is also a writer and a poet, and she wrote many poems and books, including “A Short History of the Blockade”. In her writing, she talks about topics such as decolonization and recognizing the gender violence that indigenous women face. Throughout her life, she has been majorly involved in Native American feminist movements, such as the “Idle No More Movement” which is dedicated to creating awareness around the environmental justice and broken treaties that indigenous people are facing.

Audra Simpson: Audra Simpson is Mohawk scholar who is primarily focusing on issues of indigenous recognition in politics. She as well has written a book titled “Mohawk Interruptus: Political Life Across the Borders of Settler States” which explores how the Kahnawà:ke Mohawks fought to keep their sovereignty in response to the US and Canadian governments.

Chrystos: Chrystos is a Menominee activist who is also a poet. Their poetry is defined through shared ideas of colonialism, genocide, and sexuality. One piece they wrote is titled “This Bridge Called My Back: Writings by Radical Women of Color”, and in this Chrystos is often seen calling back on spoken word and oral tradition.

Sarah Deer: Sarah Deer is a Muscogee (Creek) lawyer and professor who continues to advocate for Native American women that have fall victim to violence and assault. She was a major influence to the reauthorization of the 2013 Violence Against Women’s Act which allows for easier prosecution of non-Native assaulters.

See also
Indigenous feminism
Missing and murdered Indigenous women
Native Americans and women's suffrage in the United States
Sexual victimization of Native American women
Sterilization of Native American women

References